MZ Pictures is a specialized film and TV production company based incorporated in 2009 in Shanghai, China，whose precursor is the MZ Film Workshop founded by Mi Zi, who has been involved in the production of numerous award-winning documentaries, feature films, commercials, TV series and stage plays.

A digital 3D animation feature, The Ping Pong Rabbit is in preproduction.

A co-production project, Sweetheart Chocolate, took off at the end of 2009 and is in preproduction now. It will be filmed in both Hokkaido, Japan, and Shanghai, China. The core production team is from both Japan and China, and the lead roles will be playing by the stars from Japan, China, and Korea.

Awards 
 2007 79th Academy Awards Best Documentary, Short Subjects The Blood of Yingzhou District
 2008 Asia Pacific Screen Awards Best Performance by an Actress: Miao Pu Cherries (Nomination)
 2009 82nd Academy Awards Best Documentary, Short Subjects China's Unnatural Disaster: The Tears of Sichuan Province

Filmography

Narrative Feature 
 2011 Sweetheart Chocolate (in production)
 2008 Letters From Death Row
 2008 Forever Singing
 2008 Dowry
 2007 Cherries
 2005 China Flower
 2004 Cannot Cry

Documentary 
 2008 China's Unnatural Disaster: The Tears of Sichuan Province
 2007 The Blood of Yingzhou District

Animation 
 2012 Ping Pong Rabbit (in production) (Digital 3D Animation)

External links 
 MZ Pictures

Film production companies of China